The 2009 WNBA season is the 12th for the Detroit Shock of the Women's National Basketball Association in the United States. The Shock attempted to win the WNBA Finals, tying the record for most championships with the Houston Comets (4), but failed in the conference finals. On June 15, 2009, head coach Bill Laimbeer resigned as head coach of the Detroit Shock, due to family reasons and the desire to become an NBA head coach. Though he was unable to secure an NBA head coaching position, ESPN reported on August 30 that Laimbeer was offered, and accepted, an assistant coach position with the Minnesota Timberwolves. Despite the early struggles, the 2008 champion Detroit Shock reached the playoffs for the seventh straight year. It would be the final year in Detroit, as the Shock were purchased by Tulsa Hoops, and new ownership moved the team to Tulsa for 2010.

Offseason

Dispersal Draft
Based on the Shock's 2008 record, they could have picked 11th in the Houston Comets dispersal draft. The Shock waived their pick.

WNBA Draft
The following are the Shock's selections in the 2009 WNBA Draft.

Transactions
August 18: The Shock signed Nikki Teasley after Barbara Farris' seven-day contract expired.
August 17: The Shock acquired Crystal Kelly from the Sacramento Monarchs in exchange for Kristin Haynie.
August 4: The Shock signed Barbara Farris after Anna DeForge's seven-day contract expired.
July 27: The Shock signed Anna DeForge.
July 23: The Shock waived Anna DeForge.
July 10: The Shock signed Anna DeForge.
July 6: The Shock waived Barbara Farris.
June 28: The Shock terminated the replacement contract of Sherill Baker.
June 26: The Shock signed Sherill Baker to a replacement contract.
June 18: The Shock terminated the replacement contract of Kelly Schumacher due to the return of Cheryl Ford.
June 15: The Shock announced the resignation of Bill Laimbeer. Assistant coach Rick Mahorn was promoted to head coach, while assistant coach Cheryl Reeve took over general management duties.
June 10: The Shock terminated Britany Miller's replacement contract and signed Kelly Schumacher to a replacement contract.
June 8: The Shock signed Britany Miller to a replacement contract.
June 3: The Shock waived Kristen Rasmussen, Tiera DeLaHoussaye, Britany Miller, and Sequoia Holmes.
May 28: The Shock signed Barbara Farris.
May 27: The Shock waived Tanae Davis-Cain.
May 18: The Shock signed Kristen Rasmussen and Sequoia Holmes.
April 22: The Shock signed Kristin Haynie.
April 16: The Shock signed Tiera DeLaHoussaye to a training camp contract.
April 9: The Shock traded Ashley Shields to the Atlanta Dream in exchange for the 18th pick in the 2009 WNBA Draft.
January 30: The Shock signed Ashley Shields to a training-camp contract.
January 9: The Shock re-signed free agent Kara Braxton.
August 19, 2008: The Shock signed Taj McWilliams-Franklin to a one-year extension.
August 12, 2008: The Shock traded their second-round 2009 WNBA Draft pick to the Washington Mystics as part of the Taj McWilliams-Franklin acquisition.

Free agents

Additions

Subtractions

Roster

Season standings

Schedule

Preseason

|- align="center" bgcolor="ffbbbb"
| 1 || May 22 || 7:30pm || @ Chicago || 67-71 || Hornbuckle (14) || Miller (10) || DeLaHoussaye (5) || UIC Pavilion  3,283 || 0-1
|- align="center" bgcolor="bbffbb"
| 2 || May 27 || 11:00am || Chicago || 78-68 || Zellous (18) || Zellous (8) || Smith (5) || Palace of Auburn Hills  3,952 || 1-1
|- align="center" bgcolor="bbffbb"
| 3 || May 30 || 7:00pm || San Antonio || 62-55 || Zellous (13) || Sanni (6) || Hornbuckle (3) || Traverse City West H.S.  2,109 || 2-1
|-

Regular season

|- align="center" bgcolor="ffbbbb"
| 1 || June 6 || 2:30pm || @ Los Angeles || ABC || 58-78 || Nolan (15) || Smith (7) || McWilliams (4) || STAPLES Center  13,154 || 0-1
|- align="center" bgcolor="bbffbb"
| 2 || June 8 || 7:30pm || Los Angeles ||  || 81-52 || Nolan (27) || Hornbuckle, McWilliams (7) || Haynie, Hornbuckle, Smith (3) || Palace of Auburn Hills  13,915 || 1-1
|- align="center" bgcolor="ffbbbb"
| 3 || June 10 || 7:30pm || Washington ||  || 69-75 || Smith, McWilliams (14) || Sanni, Zellous (7) || Nolan (6) || Palace of Auburn Hills  7,329 || 1-2
|- align="center" bgcolor="ffbbbb"
| 4 || June 19 || 7:30pm || Indiana ||  || 54-66 || Nolan (13) || Hornbuckle, McWilliams (10) || Hornbuckle, Nolan, Smith (2) || Palace of Auburn Hills  7,725 || 1-3
|- align="center" bgcolor="ffbbbb"
| 5 || June 21 || 6:00pm || @ Indiana || NBA TVFSI || 70-82 || Nolan (16) || Nolan (8) || Nolan (6) || Conseco Fieldhouse  7,610 || 1-4
|- align="center" bgcolor="ffbbbb"
| 6 || June 26 || 7:30pm || @ Atlanta ||  || 86-96 || Zellous (25) || McWilliams (9) || McWilliams, Nolan (2) || Philips Arena  5,935 || 1-5
|- align="center" bgcolor="bbffbb"
| 7 || June 28 || 6:00pm || Sacramento ||  || 86-72 || Zellous (18) || Ford (8) || McWilliams, Smith (3) || Palace of Auburn Hills  7,277 || 2-5
|-

|- align="center" bgcolor="ffbbbb"
| 8 || July 2 || 7:30pm || @ New York || MSG || 64-80 || Ford (13) || Ford, Hornbuckle (10) || Smith (5) || Madison Square Garden  8,018 || 2-6
|- align="center" bgcolor="ffbbbb"
| 9 || July 5 || 6:00pm || Connecticut ||  || 92-95 (OT) || Smith (28) || Hornbuckle (12) || McWilliams (5) || Palace of Auburn Hills  6,981 || 2-7
|- align="center" bgcolor="bbffbb"
| 10 || July 11 || 7:00pm || @ Connecticut || NBA TVWCTX || 79-77 (OT) || Smith (25) || Braxton (13) || Smith (3) || Mohegan Sun Arena  6,342 || 3-7
|- align="center" bgcolor="bbffbb"
| 11 || July 15 || 10:00pm || @ Seattle || NBA TVFSN-NW || 66-62 || Smith (19) || Ford (8) || Nolan (7) || KeyArena  6,821 || 4-7
|- align="center" bgcolor="ffbbbb"
| 12 || July 18 || 10:00pm || @ Phoenix ||  || 90-97 || Smith (21) || McWilliams (12) || Smith (5) || US Airways Center  8,288 || 4-8
|- align="center" bgcolor="bbffbb"
| 13 || July 19 || 9:00pm || @ Sacramento ||  || 69-65 || McWilliams (21) || McWilliams (12) || Braxton, Nolan, Smith, Zellous (3) || ARCO Arena  7,538 || 5-8
|- align="center" bgcolor="ffbbbb"
| 14 || July 22 || 12:00pm || Atlanta ||  || 95-98 (OT) || Braxton (25) || Braxton (12) || Nolan (9) || Palace of Auburn Hills  14,439 || 5-9
|- align="center" bgcolor="bbffbb"
| 15 || July 31 || 7:30pm || Minnesota ||  || 91-83 || Nolan (22) || Ford (9) || McWilliams, Nolan (9) || Palace of Auburn Hills  9,314 || 6-9
|-

|- align="center" bgcolor="ffbbbb"
| 16 || August 2 || 6:00pm|| Connecticut ||  || 65-83 || Nolan (20) || Ford (9) || Nolan (4) || Palace of Auburn Hills  7,814 || 6-10
|- align="center" bgcolor="bbffbb"
| 17 || August 4 || 7:30pm || New York || ESPN2 || 76-64 || Nolan (26) || Nolan (14) || McWilliams, Nolan, Smith (4) || Palace of Auburn Hills  7,081 || 7-10
|- align="center" bgcolor="ffbbbb"
| 18 || August 7 || 7:00pm || @ Washington ||  || 66-70 || Braxton (14) || McWilliams (7) || Nolan (6) || Verizon Center  10,637 || 7-11
|- align="center" bgcolor="bbffbb"
| 19 || August 9 || 6:00pm || Chicago ||  || 64-58 || Zellous (19) || McWilliams (12) || Smith (4) || Palace of Auburn Hills  6,893 || 8-11
|- align="center" bgcolor="bbffbb"
| 20 || August 11 || 7:00pm || @ Washington ||  || 81-77 || Nolan (23) || McWilliams (13) || McWilliams, Zellous (4) || Verizon Center  10,398 || 9-11
|- align="center" bgcolor="ffbbbb"
| 21 || August 13 || 7:30pm || @ Atlanta ||  || 75-80 || Nolan (20) || McWilliams (10) || McWilliams (5) || Philips Arena  5,641 || 9-12
|- align="center" bgcolor="ffbbbb"
| 22 || August 15 || 7:00pm || @ Indiana ||  || 59-82 || Zellous (16) || Braxton (10) || McWilliams, Zellous (3) || Conseco Fieldhouse  9,963 || 9-13
|- align="center" bgcolor="ffbbbb"
| 23 || August 18 || 7:30pm || Seattle ||  || 75-79 || Nolan (29) || McWilliams (8) || Smith (5) || Palace of Auburn Hills  7,392 || 9-14
|- align="center" bgcolor="bbffbb"
| 24 || August 22 || 8:00pm || @ Chicago ||  || 76-67 || Smith (10) || Ford (9) || 4 players (4) || UIC Pavilion  5,167 || 10-14
|- align="center" bgcolor="bbffbb"
| 25 || August 23 || 6:00pm || San Antonio ||  || 99-87 || Smith (31) || McWilliams, Nolan (7) || Hornbuckle (7) || Palace of Auburn Hills  7,130 || 11-14
|- align="center" bgcolor="bbffbb"
| 26 || August 25 || 7:00pm || @ Connecticut ||  || 90-70 || Smith (19) || Kelly (8) || Zellous (5) || Mohegan Sun Arena  6,811 || 12-14
|- align="center" bgcolor="bbffbb"
| 27 || August 27 || 7:30pm || Atlanta ||  || 87-83 || Nolan (29) || Ford (12) || Hornbuckle (5) || Palace of Auburn Hills  5,695 || 13-14
|- align="center" bgcolor="ffbbbb"
| 28 || August 29 || 3:00pm || @ San Antonio || ESPN2 || 88-100 (OT) || Nolan (34) || Braxton (7) || Teasley (5) || AT&T Center  7,735 || 13-15
|-

|- align="center" bgcolor="bbffbb"
| 29 || September 1 || 7:30pm || Phoenix ||  || 101-99 || Ford (22) || Ford (11) || Teasley, Zellous (5) || Palace of Auburn Hills  5,239 || 14-15
|- align="center" bgcolor="bbffbb"
| 30 || September 4 || 7:30pm || Indiana ||  || 70-63 (OT) || Nolan (22) || Ford (12) || Nolan (4) || Palace of Auburn Hills  7,230 || 15-15
|- align="center" bgcolor="bbffbb"
| 31 || September 6 || 6:00pm || Chicago ||  || 84-75 || Nolan (19) || Nolan (8) || Braxton, Hornbuckle, Nolan (4) || Palace of Auburn Hills  6,619 || 16-15
|- align="center" bgcolor="ffbbbb"
| 32 || September 9 || 8:00pm || @ Minnesota ||  || 72-75 || Ford (16) || Ford (12) || Ford, Teasley, Zellous (4) || Target Center  7,423 || 16-16
|- align="center" bgcolor="bbffbb"
| 33 || September 10 || 7:30pm || New York || NBA TVMSG || 94-87 (OT) || Nolan (34) || Braxton, McWilliams (8) || Hornbuckle, Zellous (5) || Palace of Auburn Hills  8,178 || 17-16
|- align="center" bgcolor="bbffbb"
| 34 || September 12 || 8:00pm || @ Chicago ||  || 80-69 || Zellous (20) || McWilliams (10) || Nolan, Zellous (4) || UIC Pavilion  5,334 || 18-16
|-

| All games are viewable on WNBA LiveAccess

Postseason

|- align="center" bgcolor="bbffbb"
| 1 || September 16 || 8:00pm || Atlanta || ESPN2 || 94-89 || Nolan (25) || Ford (10) || Hornbuckle (5) || Palace of Auburn Hills  6,122 || 1-0
|- align="center" bgcolor="bbffbb"
| 2 || September 18 || 7:30pm || @ Atlanta || NBA TV || 94-79 || Nolan (22) || Braxton, Hornbuckle (8) || Braxton, Nolan (5) || Gwinnett Arena  4,780 || 2-0
|-

|- align="center" bgcolor="bbffbb"
| 1 || September 23 || 8:00pm || Indiana || ESPN2 || 72-56 || Zellous (23) || Braxton, Ford (9) || Zellous (5) || Palace of Auburn Hills  7,214 || 1-0
|- align="center" bgcolor="ffbbbb"
| 2 || September 25 || 7:00pm || @ Indiana || NBA TV || 75-79 || Nolan (23) || Ford (13) || Hornbuckle, Nolan, Zellous (3) || Conseco Fieldhouse  9,210 || 1-1
|- align="center" bgcolor="ffbbbb"
| 3 || September 26 || 7:00pm || @ Indiana || NBA TV || 67-72 || Nolan (16) || Ford (11) || Hornbuckle, McWilliams, Nolan (4) || Conseco Fieldhouse  18,165 || 1-2
|-

Regular Season Statistics

Player Statistics

Team Statistics

Awards and honors
Deanna Nolan was named WNBA Eastern Conference Player of the Week for the week of August 24, 2009.
Deanna Nolan was named WNBA Eastern Conference Player of the Week for the week of August 31, 2009.
Deanna Nolan was named WNBA Eastern Conference Player of the Week for the week of September 7, 2009.
Katie Smith was named to the 2009 WNBA All-Star Team as an Eastern Conference reserve.
Shavonte Zellous was named to the All-Rookie Team.
Deanna Nolan was named to the All-WNBA Second Team.
Deanna Nolan was named to the All-Defensive Second Team.

References

External links

Detroit Shock seasons
Detroit
Detroit Shock